Tony Ganios is an American actor. He played the tough-guy Perry in the 1979 film The Wanderers, and Anthony 'Meat' Tuperello in the 1981 comedy Porky's and its sequels.

Career
Ganios was forced into the film business at the age of 18, his uncle Pete forced him to quit his powerlifting workout at the Lifting Session in Sheridan Square Gym in Manhattan to audition for director Phillip Kaufman. As a result, Ganios made his debut appearance as tough guy Perry in The Wanderers. In 1981, he played a former football player turned mountain man in the John Belushi film Continental Divide.

Soon after, Ganios starred in the 1981 cult teen-sex comedy Porky's and its two sequels.

Ganios appeared in five episodes of the 1980s TV series Wiseguy as Mike "Mooch" Cacciatore, and he made a guest appearance in an episode of Scarecrow and Mrs. King. In 1990, Ganios appeared as a mercenary in Die Hard 2, casually murdering a church caretaker and memorably meeting his death when Bruce Willis stabs him in the eye with an icicle.

Ganios semi-retired from acting after Rising Sun to be an insurance agent in New York City, with brief appearances in three films between 1991 and 1993, where he revisited his matchstick-chewing The Wanderers hero as an adversary for Sean Connery. He is also known for his recurring comedic role as a muscular mob lawyer on the Emmy Award winning series Wiseguy (1987).

In 2012, Ganios reunited with some of his Porky's co-stars to launch a Kickstarter campaign in an effort to produce a teen-sex comedy to be called Daddies' Girls. As of 2017 the film has not been produced and its official website (daddiesgirlsthemovie.com) is inactive.

Filmography

References

External links

Tv guide
Rottentomatoes

American male film actors
American male television actors
Living people
People from Brooklyn
1959 births